Alejandro de la Madrid (born March 23, 1977, Ciudad de México, México), is a Mexican actor.

Filmography

Films roles

Television  roles

References

External links 
 

1977 births
Living people
Mexican male film actors
Mexican male stage actors
Mexican male telenovela actors
Mexican male television actors
Male actors from Mexico City
20th-century Mexican male actors
21st-century Mexican male actors